The 2021 Michigan Wolverines baseball team represented the University of Michigan in the 2021 NCAA Division I baseball season. The Wolverines, led by head coach Erik Bakich in his ninth season, are a member of the Big Ten Conference and played their home games at Wilpon Baseball Complex in Ann Arbor, Michigan.

Previous season
The Wolverines finished the 2020 season 8–7 overall, in a season shortened due to the COVID-19 pandemic.

Preseason
On November 6, 2020, former Michigan pitching coach Chris Fetter was named pitching coach for the Detroit Tigers of Major League Baseball (MLB).

On January 29, 2021, Steve Merriman was named pitching coach and Brandon Inge was named volunteer assistant coach for the Wolverines.

Michigan was ranked No. 20 by Baseball America and No. 18 by Collegiate Baseball Newspaper in the preseason polls, the only Big Ten Conference team named in each poll. Redshirt sophomore Steven Hajjar was named to the Preseason All-America Third Team. On March 4, the Big Ten Coaches voted Michigan as the preseason favorite to win the conference.

Roster

Schedule

Rankings

Awards and honors

Major League Baseball Draft
The following Wolverines were selected in the 2021 Major League Baseball draft:

References

Michigan
Michigan
Michigan
Michigan Wolverines baseball seasons